Andrew Huang is a Canadian YouTube personality, musician, music producer, and video producer. He is best known for his "Song Challenge" video series, which invites viewers to dare him in feats of musicianship, as well as for several viral videos featuring his music. He is also known for his videos where he creates music using sounds from unconventional objects and instruments. Huang has released more than 50 albums of original music independently and through various collaborations, under his own name as well as under various pseudonyms.

As of August 2022, his YouTube channel has accumulated more than 309 million views with more than 2.29 million subscribers.

Personal life
Huang was born and raised in Ottawa, Ontario. He obtained a Bachelor of Fine Arts at York University studying music before becoming self-employed as a music producer and YouTube personality. At the age of 20, Huang developed a hearing loss issue overnight that medical professionals have been unable to explain. It has resulted in a diminished bass response and reduction in volume in both his ears, and is more pronounced on the right side. Due to this, Huang often seeks help from other producers during the mixing stages of production. He lives in Toronto with his wife Esther and their daughter Evelyn. Huang has no pronoun preference, and is gender non-conforming.

Early career
After little success finding a part-time job during his university studies, Huang began auctioning off his songwriting skills to the highest bidder on eBay. The winning bidders received a custom song in any genre, written and recorded to their specifications.

In response to the success of the eBay auctions, in April 2004, Huang launched the website Songs To Wear Pants To, where visitors to the site could commission songs based on personal requests. The popularity of the site grew as Huang also began to take on commissions for free, provided the song idea interested him. The free songs often took on a comedic angle, either by poking fun at the person who requested the song, or simply because Huang would choose the most outrageous of submitted ideas to write about. What resulted was an eclectic archive of hip hop, classical, doo wop, electronic, folk, rock and heavy metal tunes performed entirely by Huang.

YouTube channel
In October 2006, Huang started a channel on YouTube and began uploading fan-made music videos for the songs he created through Songs To Wear Pants To. Huang's channel is known for a wide variety of musical genres, influences, and projects, often thematically focused. Huang's videos often feature the artist himself, and frequently aim to showcase various elements of the song. 

In November 2010, Huang uploaded the song "Pink Fluffy Unicorns Dancing on Rainbows" (PFUDOR) on his YouTube channel. Inspired by a comment left on a previous YouTube video, it became a viral video. Huang stated that he "never expected [PFUDOR] to be my best-known work". As of January 2023, the song has over 13 million views on Huang's original upload. An animation set to the song created by the channel "Fluffle Puff" has a further 60 million YouTube views.

Huang is known for his "Song Challenge" series, an extension of the idea behind Songs To Wear Pants To, in which Huang takes on musical challenges submitted by viewers via social media. In 2013, he released a rap song titled "Vass Tunga", written in five different languages.

Huang occasionally uses unusual instruments to record cover versions of songs. One of his early efforts was released a week before AMC's Breaking Bad aired its series finale, featuring a cover of its unsettling title music using clandestine chemistry equipment. Other examples include a cover version of "99 Red Balloons" recorded with balloons, and a cover of The Weeknd's "Can't Feel My Face", using dental instruments filmed in his dentist's office.

In 2016, Huang was signed to the YouTube network Fullscreen. Fullscreen became defunct on October 2021.

He launched his music production courses in 2020.

On March 18, 2021, Huang released a video titled "Final song before I leave" in which he ostensibly claimed that he is leaving Earth to go to space. The video used footage from real rocket launches including the Antares and other doctored images and videos, and was speculated by Newsweek to be promotional for an upcoming music project. The album Spacetime was released on August 20, 2021.

Collaborations

Huang has collaborated with various other YouTube personalities, most notably with Boyinaband and Hannah Hart. He provided instrumentation and songwriting for Hank Green and the Perfect Strangers' Incongruent, and toured across the United States with the band. Huang produced the music for Rhett and Link's "Geeks vs. Nerds" music video in 2013.

In 2010, Huang teamed up with musician and internet personality Gunnarolla to produce videos and music, including the popular series We Are What You Tweet and New State Plates. The pair have toured North America, Australia, and New Zealand together. Huang and Gunnarolla later created electropop music duo Dreamz. As a duo, they entered CBC Music's Searchlight contest under this new name, and their debut single "Come On" was selected as CBC Here and Now's Song of the Week on March 11, 2013. Dreamz reached the Top 16 of the contest representing Toronto.

In 2008, Huang entered a contest run by American Express and won a chance to develop a music project with Emily Haines, lead vocalist for Canadian indie band Metric. He created an interactive installation featuring a series of videos that visitors could use to create ambient music. The piece was exhibited at the Four Seasons Centre in Toronto during November 2011.

Huang composed the anthem for WWF-Canada's official Earth Hour in 2012 using lyrics from user-submitted suggestions, taking the title of "Canada's first official crowd sourced song". Huang later performed the song live during Toronto's 2012 and 2013 Earth Day celebrations.

In late 2018, Huang formed a duo with Rob Scallon called First of October, where Huang and Scallon record an entire 10-track album in one recording session. The group has made four albums, Ten Hours, Gourmet Ravioli, Gotta Record Everything Good, and Chaos all written and recorded in a day each.

In 2018, Huang was nominated for an iHeartRadio Music Award in the "Social Star" category.

In June 2019, Andrew began a new project with YouTuber and science educator Hank Green, Journey to the Microcosmos, a YouTube channel uploading short videos of microscope slides accompanied by voiceovers explaining different mechanisms of microscopic biological life. Huang produces all of the ambient tracks for the show's background music.

On September 25, 2020, Huang was featured on track 8, "Top Secret", on funk-rock band TWRP's album "Over The Top".

Discography 
List adapted from Spotify on September 10, 2022.
Studio albums
 Summer (2009)
 Autumn (2010)
 Hearing a Truth Serum (2011)
 Love Songs (2011)
 Schism (2011)
 Love & Desolation (2012)
 Droop (2012)
 You Are The Devil (2012)
 Magical Body (2013)
 Lip Bomb (2013)
 Voyager (2013)
 The Coldest Darkness (2013)
 Winter (2014)
 Internet (2014)
 Spring (2014)
 Galaxy (2014)
 Comet (2014)
 Interplanetary (2014)
 Bouncy Castle (2015)
 Cosmos (2015)
 Pintxos (2015)
 Interstellar (2016)
 Lo-fi (2017)
 Stars (2017)
 FX (2018)
 TV & Video Games (2018)
 Synth City (2019)
 Alabaster (2019)
 Ganglia (2020)
 Ooo (2021)
 Spacetime (2021)
 Dust & Dewdrops (2022)

References

External links
 

Canadian pop musicians
York University alumni
Canadian YouTubers
1984 births
Musicians from Ottawa
Canadian musicians of Chinese descent
Living people
Ableton Live users
Music YouTubers
Comedy YouTubers
Educational and science YouTubers
YouTube vloggers
Canadian electronic musicians
Canadian ambient musicians
Canadian rock musicians
21st-century Canadian male musicians